The University of Indonesia (abbreviated as UI) is a public university in Depok, West Java and Salemba, Jakarta, Indonesia. It is one of the oldest tertiary-level educational institutions in Indonesia (known as the Dutch East Indies when UI was established), and is generally considered one of the most prestigious universities in Indonesia, along with the Gadjah Mada University and Bandung Institute of Technology. In the 2019 QS World Universities Ranking, UI is ranked 1st in Indonesia, 57th in Asia and 292nd in the world.

History 

The roots of UI date back to 1851. At that time, the colonial government of the Dutch East Indies established a school to train medical assistants. Training lasted for two years, and the graduates were certified to provide basic medical treatments. The degree conferred was Javanese Doctor, as the graduates were certified only to open their practice in the Dutch East Indies, especially Java. The program became more comprehensive; by 1864 it was expanded to three years. By 1875, the program of study had reached seven years and the graduates were entitled to the degree of Medical Doctor.

The next step came in 1898, when the Dutch East Indies government established a new school to train medical doctors, named STOVIA (School tot Opleiding van Inlandsche Artsen). A school building was opened in March 1902, in a building that is now the Museum of National Awakening. The prerequisite to enter STOVIA was roughly the equivalent of a junior high school diploma. The schooling took nine years, so it was a mix between high school and university education. Many STOVIA graduates later played important roles in Indonesia's national movement toward independence, as well in developing medical education in Indonesia.

In 1924, the colonial government decided to open a new tertiary-level educational facility, the RHS (Rechts Hogeschool), to train civilian officers and servants. The RHS would later evolve into the Faculty of Law. In 1927, STOVIA's status was changed to that of a full tertiary-level institution and its name was changed to GHS (Geneeskundige Hogeschool). The GHS occupied the same main building and used the same teaching hospital as the current Faculty of Medicine. Many GHS alumni would later play roles in establishing Universitas Indonesia.

After Indonesia gained independence, the Indonesian Institute for Higher Education (BPTRI) was established in Jakarta consisting of three faculties: Medicine and Pharmacy, Letters, and Law. The institute produced its first 90 graduate students as medical doctors in the same year. When the Dutch colonial army occupied Jakarta in late 1945, the BPTRI moved to Klaten, Surakarta, Yogyakarta, Surabaya and Malang. In 1946, the Dutch colonial government established the Nood Universiteit or Emergency University at Jakarta. In 1947, the name was changed to Universiteit van Indonesië (UVI) or Universitas Indonesia. Following the Indonesian National Revolution, the government established a state university in Jakarta in February 1950. The name was Universiteit Indonesia, comprising the BPTRI units and the former UVI, which was later changed into Universitas Indonesia (UI).

By 1950, UI was a multi-campus university, with faculties in Jakarta (Medicine, Law, and Letters), Bogor (Agronomy and Veterinary Medicine), Bandung (Engineering, Mathematics and Natural Sciences), Surabaya (Medicine and Dentistry), and Makassar (Economics and Law). The Surabaya campus became the University of Airlangga in 1954. In the following year, the Makassar campus became the University of Hasanuddin. In 1959, the Bandung campus became the Bandung Institute of Technology. The School for Physical Education, which was also in Bandung, became part of Padjadjaran University in 1960. In 1964, the Bogor campus became the Bogor Agricultural Institute and the Faculty of Teaching and Education in Jakarta became the Institute of Teaching and Education (now the State University of Jakarta). By 1965, UI consisted of three campuses, all in Jakarta: Salemba (Medicine, Dentistry, Economics, Engineering, Science and the Graduate School), Rawamangun (Letters, Law, Social Science and Psychology) and Pegangsaan (Public Health and parts of Medicine).

In 1987, several faculties from the Salemba and Rawamangun campuses moved to a newly built campus in the outskirts of Jakarta. The campus in southern Jakarta is known as the Depok campus (it is in the city of Depok).

In the year 2007–2008, Universitas Indonesia underwent substantial reform. Revenue was significantly increased from 800 billion to 1.6 trillion rupiah. The number of research publications has increased. This is also the case with the university's endowment fund.

The rector of the Universitas Indonesia (July 2007), Prof Dr der.soz. Gumilar Rusliwa Somantri, is the youngest leader among university presidents in Indonesia. He has been elected to and serves on the board of directors of the Association of Pacific Rim Universities (APRU).

According to the 2008 survey of Globe Asia, UI ranked number first among the top universities in Indonesia. This report has been supported by a leading Indonesian magazine Tempo, which carried out a survey and analysis to rank universities and education in Indonesia. Universitas Indonesia has improved its research collaboration with international partners.

In August 2008, the university won the Indonesia ICT award for the smart campus with best content and application. In terms of accessibility and connectivity, Universitas Indonesia has won an award because 90% of the university's area is covered by IT infrastructure and services with its 305 Mbit/s. connection to the Internet, and its 155 Mbit/s. connection to the Indonesia Higher Education Research Network (Inherent).

Logo and philosophy
The earliest form of the logo of Universitas Indonesia was created in 1952 by Sumaxtono (a.k.a. Sumartono), a student from the 1951 Art Department class, Faculty of Engineering, at the time known as the Fakulteit Teknik Universiteit Indonesia, in Bandung.

The logo is the kala-makara, a symbol of the two sources of energy in nature. Kala is the energy from above (the power of the sun), while makara represents the energy from below (the power of the Earth). The two powers are combined and stylized into a symbol that represents the function of Universitas Indonesia as a source of knowledge.

The logo of Universitas Indonesia carries the following interpretation:

 The tree, which includes the buds and the branches, represents science and its branches, implying that the buds will soon flourish and turn into new branches of science. The buds will continue to blossom as long as the main tree is alive. By this, Sumaxtono intended to state that the branches of science will continuously grow.
 Water pouring down from the makara signifies the works of science.

The logo design and the meaning it carried were presented to Srihadi (a student from the 1952 class from the same department) in 1952. Prof. KRHT H. Srihadi Soedarsono Adhikoesoemo, M.A. who created the logo of Bandung Institute of Technology, was not sure who authenticated this logo or when. He was sure, however, that it was printed on the cover of the book Universiteit Indonesia, Fakulteit Teknik, Bandung: Rentjana Untuk Tahun Peladjaran 1952-1953 (Universitas Indonesia, Faculty of Engineering, Bandung: Course Plans for Academic Years 1952–1953), published by AID, Bandung, 120 pages, using the original design by Sumaxtono (without the pentagonal border). Each department / faculty has its own color scheme for the logo, for example: red for the Faculty of Law, blue for the Faculty of Engineering, blue-red for the Faculty of Computer Science, and sky blue for the Faculty of Psychology.

Campuses

Salemba 
The Salemba campus, located in Central Jakarta, is dedicated mostly to the faculties of Medicine and Dentistry. It adjoins with Cipto Mangunkusumo National Hospital (RSCM) as well as the University Dental Hospital. It houses parts of the postgraduate program, the Faculty of Law (Master of Law Science and Law Science Doctoral Program), Faculty of Economics (Extension and Master of Management programs), the School of Environmental Science (Master of Environmental Science and Environmental Science Doctoral Program), and the Faculty of Engineering (laboratories).

Depok 

The Depok campus, in Depok, just south of Jakarta, was built during the mid-1980s to accommodate the modernization of the university. It is now the main campus. Most of the faculties (Mathematics and Natural Sciences, Humanities, Pharmacy, Engineering, Psychology, Letters, Economics, Social Politics, Law, Computing, Nursing and Public Health) have been relocated here.

The Depok campus is alongside the Jakarta-Bogor commuter railway, offering students easy access to transport by rail. Students also benefit from the frequent commuter bus services connecting many parts of Jakarta to Depok.

Undergraduate teaching of the medical and dental faculties relocated to Depok in 2010.

The main library of the university is on the campus, along with other facilities such as the Student Services Center, Student Activities Center, gymnasium, stadium, hockey field, hotel (Wisma Makara), travel agent and the dormitory.

Depok campus is home to six lakes which are located across the campus.  The lakes are Kenanga Lake, Agathis Lake, Mahoni Lake, Puspa Lake, Ulin Lake, Salam Lake (each name initial comprises for word "KAMPUS", indonesian word for campus).

Sustainability 

Universitas Indonesia maintains 75% of its area for reforestation. Over 20 kilometers of bicycle path have been created and shuttle buses are provided for the students and faculty. The bicycles and buses are to decrease the number of vehicles in the campus.

UI established the GreenMetric Ranking of World Universities in April 2010 to provide detailed profiles of participating universities who wish to make the necessary steps to promote sustainable operations. It is hoped that the rankings, when published, will promote a greater environmental awareness for all institutions of higher learning of the value of putting in places and systems that will have a positive impact on global warming and climate change, particularly those that help reduce carbon emissions through efficient energy use, and alternative forms of transport, greening the campus and recycling. UI's GreenMetric World University Ranking to show the extent to which a university is ‘green’ and become the role model of a sustainable society.

The new library "crystal of knowledge" at Depok used a sustainable concept. Not only in green area and transportation, Universitas Indonesia has relocated nine massive African baobab trees aging over 100 years (one said to be 240 years old) to the Depok campus to prove the university commitment in going green.

Facilities

Transportation

Campus bus 
Campus buses are available for student transportation at the Depok campus for free. Locals call them "Bikun", shortened word of "Bis Kuning" or "yellow bus," as the buses are mostly that color. In 2005, Universitas Indonesia had a total of 20 campus buses. They serve regular routes in the campus area from Monday to Friday from 7:00 AM to 9:00 PM and Saturday from 7:00 AM to 2:00 PM.

Campus bike 
Since 2007, Universitas Indonesia has offered a bike rental facility for its students. For the rent, students need to show their UI student card to the rental officer. The bike must be used on bike lanes and it must be returned to where it was rented or another bike station. Campus bikes can be rented until 5:00 PM.

Others 
The Depok campus is served by Universitas Indonesia Station (which is located inside the campus, close to the front main gate) and Pondok Cina (located outside the campus) stations within KRL Commuterline commuter rail system, while its Salemba campus is connected with Transjakarta Salemba UI bus station.

Health center 
The polyclinic provides free health services for all UI students. Students should obtain a free card and medical record before getting treatments. The available health services are general health service and dental service (including orthodontia).

At February 2019, the RSUI (Rumah Sakit UI) or UI Hospital is launched while previously has limitedly served the internal campus civitas academica and staffs since February 2018. The hospital is located in the medical science complex (area rumpun ilmu kesehatan). It has the capacity of 300 rooms.

Sports

Wisma Makara 
The Wisma Makara ("Makara Lodge") is located on Universitas Indonesia's Depok campus and considered to be among the finest accommodation in Depok. The lodge is well suited for public activities such as seminars, trainings, and workshops. Surrounded by natural forest and blue lakes, the atmosphere is tranquil.

Student hall 
Salemba Student Hall is one of the facilities under the management of the Students Affairs and Alumni Relationship Deputy. The building is often used for events such as seminars, meetings, etc. With a capacity of 300 people, it can be used by UI students and personnel, as well as rented for public use.

Library 

The library at the Depok campus was launched on May 13, 2011. Built on a 33,000 meter square area, this library is considered the largest library in Southeast Asia. Designed according to a sustainable building concept, the library powers itself with solar energy. It is smoke-free, green, and economical in terms of electricity, water and paper usage. Universitas Indonesia Library has the capacity to accommodate about 20,000 visitors per day and have collection of 1,500,000 books.

Dormitory 
Universitas Indonesia has two student dormitories, one in Depok (Asrama UI) and one in Wismarini. The first dormitory is located on the Depok campus and has 480 men's rooms and 615 women's rooms, with each accommodating one to three persons. The Wismarini dormitory is located at Jl. Otto Iskandar no. 38 Jakarta Timur and has 72 men's rooms and 111 women's rooms. The Wismarini dormitory is only for students who take lectures at the Medicine or Dental faculties and any program held at Salemba campus.

Primarily dedicated for students for regular and vocation program, the maximum duration for rent in the Depok dormitory (Asrama UI) is 1 year. The facilities in this dormitory are rooms, canteen, wi-fi, campus bus, campus bike, automatic teller machine, praying area, and security. The foods and drinks served in this dormitory canteen are relatively affordable, and usually fully-seated by students.

Mosque

Masjid Ukhuwah Islamiyah (MUI) 
Casually pronounced by its abbreviation "MUI". This mosque is in the Depok campus, surrounded by a natural environment and Kenanga Lake. Construction began on January 28, 1987, and it was used for the first time on September 4, 1987, for Friday prayer. This mosque is relatively located at the center of the university, making it commonly full capacity during Friday prayer. There are also large capacity parking lots in front of the mosque for convenience. The mosque is served by campus bus route, with bus stop dedicated to the mosque namely "Halte MUI" or MUI Bus Stop.

Masjid Arief Rahman Hakim (ARH) at Salemba
Construction of this mosque, located inside the Salemba campus, was started in 1966 based on a UI rector's decree. ARH mosque's vision is to become the center of Islam on the campus, to produce modern Muslims who have both faith and scientific thought, capable of practicing religion and solving religious problems.

Academics

Faculties 
The university consists of 14 faculties, 2 schools, and 1 program providing courses at the undergraduate, graduate and postgraduate levels. Some graduate and postgraduate courses are managed by the separate postgraduate program.

Ranking 

In the QS World University Rankings 2019, Universitas Indonesia is still the highest-ranked Indonesian school. UI  has fallen in the world rankings this year, from 277th (2018 ranking) down to 292nd (2019 ranking), yet UI has moved up one spot from 58th to 57th in Asia. In 2022, UI ranked 290th globally and 56th in Asia.

However, in the Times Higher Education Rankings 2019, UI dramatically rose this year, climbing 200 spots from 801-1000th to the range of 601-800th in the world. However, in the 2020, UI ranked 801-1000th in global and ranked 162nd in Asia.

In 2022, UI ranked as the best university in Indonesia and a tie world ranking of 878 and 217 in Asia according to US News 2022 Best Global Universities Rankings.

In 2010, according to University Ranking by Academic Performance (URAP), Universitas Indonesia was the best university in Indonesia and 1,463rd university in the world. The university scored higher than any other Indonesian university in the Times Higher Education-QS World University Rankings of 2006 [250]. It ranked number 395 in 2007 and 287th in 2008. Now, Universitas Indonesia is placed at 201 on the 2009 World University Rankings. Based on Quacquarelli Symonds (QS) Asian Top Universities, published in May 2011, Universitas Indonesia rank was 50th place in Asia. In social science and management, UI secured in 14th position and followed by art and humanities at 19th, life sciences and medicine at 25th, while in IT and engineering it came in 52nd.

According to the latest survey of Globe Asia (2008), UI ranked first among the top universities in Indonesia This report has been supported by a leading Indonesian magazine Tempo, which carried out a survey and analysis to rank universities and education in Indonesia.

 UI was granted the Indonesia ICT Award (INAICTA) 2008 for the best university in Indonesia in terms of Best IT and Infrastructure under the category of Best Content and Application. UI was recognized in INAICTA 2008 as the university with the best access and connectivity.
 UI has a training center in CDMA and NGN in collaboration with Huawei and the Ministry of Information Technology and Communication.
 Through a green campus initiative, more than 40,000 members of UI community support, promote and ensure a sustainable future in which global warming is the main concern. Ten kilometers of bicycle track were built across the Depok campus in 2008.
 UI has greatly improved its ranking during the last three years. UI ranked 201 in Times Higher Education (THES) world university ranking, 287 in THES 2008 as a world class university and ranked 395 in THES 2007. In 2010, UI rank was dropped to 236 in THES but still as the leading Indonesian university.
 UI remains as one of the top 50 most prestigious universities in Asia by QS World University rankings for two consecutive years (2009–2010) and the only Indonesian university on the list.
 In 2019 got the 2nd best position (the previous rank was 6th position in 2018) at the university's National Ranking from the Ministry of Research and Technology.

Achievements 
 Christiaan Eijkman (The Director of the Javanese Medical Doctor School, forerunner of the University of Indonesia) was awarded the Nobel Prize in Physiology or Medicine in 1929. He was the first to discover a substance in rice husk, subsequently to be known as vitamin B1, and was also awarded the Prize for his new of investigating and his method to control diseases caused by vitamin deficiency.
  Members and alumni were elected in 2007 to major national academic positions and became members of President Yudhoyono's cabinet as well as the parliament.
  It is one of the oldest universities in Indonesia, with its roots going back to the establishment in 1848 of the school for Javanese Doctors.
  It is the best Indonesian university according to Globe Asia Magazine 2008.
  It was granted the Indonesia ICT Award (INAICTA) 2008 for the best university in Indonesia in terms of Best IT and Infrastructure under the category of Best Content and Application. UI was recognized in INAICTA 2008 as the university with the best access and connectivity.
  It has hosted the Indonesia Robot Contest six times because it has the most comprehensive facilities and student activities to support the annual event of Indonesia Higher Education Institution of the University of Natural Education.
   Universitas Indonesia community support, promote and ensure a sustainable future in which global warming is the main concern. Ten kilometers of bicycle track were built across the Depok campus of Universitas Indonesia during 2008.
  The best university in ICT in Indonesia and The first champion of Collective Knowledge and Robust Applications, Infrastruktur – The Most Manage Local Node and Managing Excellence for Outstanding Individuals on Telkom Smart Campus (TESCA) 2010
  Awarded first prize in the Telcom Smart Campus Award Tesca 2010 for collective Knowledge and Robust Applications.
  Awarded second prize in the Telcom Smart Campus Award Tesca 2010 for infrastructure – The Most Manageable Node.
Awarded first prize in the Telcom Smart Campus Award Tesca 2010 for Outstanding Individuals: Agus Awaludin, the UI Network Coordinator.
  Awarded the favorite booth in 19th Education and Training Expo in 2010 at Jakarta Convention Center.
  Won the best and the most favorite stand in Canisius College Education Fair in 2010.
  First prize winner in State University Category Best website, second prize winner for magazine and third prize winner for souvenir at the 2010 Anugerah Media Humas competition held by Government Institutions of Public Relations Coordinating Board.

Collaboration with overseas universities 

 UI collaborates with the University of Science, Malaysia (USM)—Singapore University of Social Sciences (SUSS) on SUSS's BA Malay Language and Literature.
 The Faculty of Political Sciences of UI makes an International Collaboration with the Faculty of Arts, The University of Melbourne, Australia.
 The Faculty of Administrative Sciences of UI conducted a collaboration with the Seoul National University (SNU) in Administrative Science Postgraduate Program.
The Faculty of Humanities of UI signed MoU and/or AOI on academic cooperation with several overseas universities, such as:

Student organizations 
Universitas Indonesia offers students a wide range of organizational activities, those are:

 The Student Representatives Council (DPM, Indonesian: Dewan Perwakilan Mahasiswa): the student legislative body at the university level;
 The Student Executive Board (BEM, Indonesian: Badan Eksekutif Mahasiswa): the student executive body at the university level and faculty level;
 SALAM UI (Nuansa Islam Mahasiswa Universitas Indonesia); the student Moslem organization at the university level;
 PO UI (Persekutuan Oikumene Universitas Indonesia); the Protestant student organization at the university level;
 SUMA UI (Suara Mahasiswa Universitas Indonesia); the student press organization at the university level;
 KMB UI (Keluarga Mahasiswa Buddhis Universitas Indonesia); the Buddhist student organization at the university level;
 KMK UI (Keluarga Mahasiswa Katolik Universitas Indonesia); the Catholic student organization at the university level;
 KMHD UI (Keluarga Mahasiswa Hindu Dharma Universitas Indonesia); the Hindu student organization at the university level;
 The Units for Student Activities constitutes a medium for student activities at the university level with the purpose of developing students' hobbies, interests and talents. They are:
 Arts: Marching Band Madah Bahana, Mahawaditra Symphony Orchestra, Paragita Student Choir, Ballroom Dance (Dancesport), Dance Group Krida Budaya, and a Theater Group.
 Sports: Equestrian Club, Badminton, Hockey, Volley Ball, Soccer, Table Tennis, Tennis, Basket Ball, Swimming, Bridge, Athletic, and Softball.
 Martial Art: Silat Merpati Putih, Aikido, Tae Kwon Do, Sin Lam Ba.
 Others: Islamic Students Association (Salam UI), Ministry of Christian Students (PO UI), Wira Makara Student Regiment Group, Student's Association for Nature, Foreign Policy Community of Indonesia Chapter UI (FPCI UI), Association internationale des étudiants en sciences économiques et commerciales (AIESEC UI), Eka Prasetya Study Group (KSM Eka Prasetya), Entrepreneurship Club CEDS, English Debating Society (EDS), Catholic Students Assembly, Journalistic Club (SUMA), Students Radio Station (RTC UI), UI Model United Nations Club (UI MUN Club).

Research organizations 
According to the university's website, there are numerous research organizations in UI:

 UI Directorate for Research and Public Service
 APEC Study Centre UI
 ASEAN Study Center FISIP UI
 Center for Computing and IT (CC IT)
 Center for Environmental Health and Industrial
 Center for Global Civil Society Studies (Pacivis)
 Center for Research on Intergroup Relations and Conflict Resolution (CERIC)
 Center for Excellence Indigenous Biological Resources-Genome Studies (CoE IBR-GS)
 Center for Excellence Nano Science and Technology (CoE NST)
 Center on Child Protection (PUSKAPA)
 Health Research Center for Crisis and Disaster (HRCCD)
 Institute of Human Virology and Cancer Biology (IHVCB).
 Research Group, Studies and Application of Basic Law Science
 Anthropology Laboratory
 Political Science Laboratory
 Sociology Laboratory/ Center for Sociological Studies
 Institute of Demography
 Institute for Law and Society Studies
 Institute for Law and Technology Studies
 Institute for Fiscal Law Studies
 Institute for Civil Code Studies
 Institute for Islam and Islamic Law Studies
 Institute for Competition and Trade Policy Studies
 Institute for Capital Market and Financial Studies
 Institute for Law Institution Studies
 Institute for Sociology of Law and Constitution Studies
 Institute for Psychological Research (LPPsi)
 Institute for Measurement Instrument and Psychological Education Development (LPSP3)
 Institute for Indonesian Formal Law and Judicial System Studies
 Institute for International Law Studies
 Institute for Economy and Society Studies (LPEM)
 Institute for Applied Psychology (LPT)
 Institute for Law and Economic Studies

 Integrated Laboratory on Endocrinology Science
 Centre of Computer Science's (PUSILKOM)
 Centre for Area and Urban Studies
 Centre for Health Administration and Policy Studies (CHAMPS)
 Centre for Anthropology Studies
 Centre for Australian Studies
 Centre for Disability Studies
 Centre for Health Economic and Policy Studies (PKEKK)
 Centre for European Studies
 Centre for Energy Studies
 Centre for International Relation Studies (CIRES)
 Center for Law and Good Governance Studies (CLGS)
 Centre for Administration Science Studies
 Centre for Social Welfare Science Studies
 Centre for Social Welfare Studies
 Centre for Criminology Studies
 Centre for Social and Political Development Studies
 Centre for Political Studies (Puskapol)
 Centre for Environmental Risk and Safety Studies
 Centre for Middle East and Islamic Studies
 Centre for American Area Studies
 Centre for Applied Geographics Research
 Centre for Family Welfare Research (PUSKA & IMPACT)
 Centre for Societal and Cultural Research (PPKB)
 Centre for Development Institution Research
 Centre for Science and Technology Research
 Centre for Human and Environmental Resources Research
 Centre for Epidemiological Research and Surveillance (PRES)
 Centre for Marine Studies
 Centre for Japanese Studies (PSJ)
 Centre for Natural Product and Medicine Studies
 Centre of Communication Studies
 Centre of Sharia Economics and Business Studies
 Research Centre for Materials Science
 SEAMEO- TROPMED RCCN

Center on nuclear medicine
In cooperation with the National Nuclear Energy Agency (Batan) and International Atomic Energy Agency (IAEA), Universitas Indonesia will have a medical physics center at Depok, West Java campus, which will be operated in 2012 as cancer treatment center.

Notable people 

UI has produced over 400,000 graduates. Many distinguished figures, both Indonesians and foreigners, were granted the "Doctor Honoris Causa" (Dr. HC) from Universitas Indonesia. Distinguished figures, including: Sri Mulyani Indrawati (Managing Director and COO of World Bank), Jusuf Wanandi (Co-chair of Pacific Economic Cooperation Council (PECC)), Prof. Mr. Sutan Takdir Alisjahbana, Taufik Ismail, Erwin Gutawa, Drs. Hans Bague Jassin received the title Doctor Honoris Causa in literature. Drs. Mohammad Hatta, the first vice president of Indonesia, received Doctor Honoris Causa in law. Prof. Miriam Budiardjo, M. A. received her Doctor Honoris Causa in 1997 in political science. Abdullah Gül, president of the Republic of Turkey, received his Doctor Honoris Causa title on April 6, 2011.

References

External links 

 Official site
 FKUI
 Student scholarship site
 Repository site
 Journal site
 Library site

 
Nursing schools in Indonesia
Universities in Jakarta
ASEAN University Network
Educational institutions established in 1851
1851 establishments in the Dutch East Indies
Indonesian state universities
Buildings and structures in Depok
Universities in West Java